The 2022 Indonesian Basketball League (or IBL Tokopedia for sponsorship reasons) was the seventh season since the re-branding by Starting5. After successfully implemented the "bubble" system in last year's season, IBL decided to return into the Series format with the supporters are returning into stadium. The season would be held with implementing strict health protocols that recommended by the government. The regular season began on 15 January 2022 and was suspended on 2 February 2022 until 3 March 2022, then the remaining series at the regular season in Yogyakarta, Solo, Surabaya, Denpasar, as well as the post season in Bandung has been cancelled as a result of the COVID-19 pandemic. The series return again to "bubble" after many players get Covid-19.

Schedule and location

Homebase

Teams 
League record of 16 teams competing throughout the season – 12 teams from last season and 4 new teams joined from the expansion process.

New teams 
 Bumi Borneo Basketball Pontianak joined the league after being granted a IBL licence.
 Evos Thunder Bogor joined the league after EVOS issued and granted a IBL licence.
 RANS PIK Basketball Jakarta joined the league after RANS issued and granted a IBL licence.
 Tangerang Hawks joined the league after being granted a IBL licence.

Name changes 
 Bima Perkasa Jogja would be known as DNA Bima Perkasa Jogja from this season after acquiring new sponsorship.
 West Bandits Solo would be known as West Bandits Combiphar Solo from this season after acquiring new sponsorship.
 Louvre Dewa United Surabaya would be known as Dewa United Surabaya from this season after Louvre pull-out from sponsorship and preparing another team in ASEAN Basketball League.

Personnel and Kits

Drafts

Foreign players

Rookie

1st round

2nd round

Recommended round

Regular season

Table

Red Division

White Division

Final standings

Results

Playoffs

Bracket

Statistics

Individual game highs

Individual statistic

Individual awards 
Most Valuable Player : Abraham Damar Grahita, (Prawira Bandung)  

Foreign Player of the Year : Shavar Newkirk, (NSH Mountain Gold Timika) 

Rookie of the Year : Yudha Saputera, (Prawira Bandung)  

Coach of the Year : David Singleton, (Prawira Bandung)  

Defensive Player of the Year : Ruslan, (NSH Mountain Gold Timika) 

Sixthman of the Year : Rio Disi, (West Bandits Combiphar Solo) 

Most Improve Player of the Year : Hengki Infandi,  (NSH Mountain Gold Timika) 

Best Referee of the Year : Budi Marfan

All-Star Games

Pre-game 
Skill-challenge champion : Team Ferdian: Ferdian Purwoko, Riko Hartono, Nina Yunita

Three-point contest champion : Indra Muhammad (DNA Bima Perkasa)

Half game 
Slam-dunk contest champion : Jarron Crump (Tangerang Hawks)

Game

White Division

Red Division

Most Valuable Player

Local Best Performer

Finals

Finals MVP

References

External links 
 Official Website

2021–22 in Asian basketball leagues
2022 in Indonesian sport
Basketball in Indonesia